Don Desperado is a 1927 American silent Western film directed by Leo D. Maloney starring Maloney, Eugenia Gilbert and Charles Bartlett.

Cast
 Leo D. Maloney as Leo McHale
 Eugenia Gilbert as Doris Jessup
 Frederick Dana as Nathan Jessup
 Charles Bartlett as Aaron Blaisdell
 Whitehorse as Ables
 Bud Osborne as Frenchy
 Allen Watt as Agent
 Morgan Davis as Joe Jessup
 Harry W. Ramsey as Dr. Wilder

References

External links
 

1927 films
1927 Western (genre) films
American black-and-white films
Films directed by Leo D. Maloney
Pathé Exchange films
Silent American Western (genre) films
1920s English-language films
1920s American films